Karl Gordon Lark (December 13, 1930, Lafayette, Indiana – April 10, 2020) was an American biologist and a Distinguished Professor Emeritus at the University of Utah, known for his research on canine genetics.

He graduated in 1948 with a bachelor's degree from the University of Chicago and in 1952 with a Ph.D. from New York University. After three years as a postdoc, he was from 1956 to 1963 a faculty member in Medical Microbiology at St. Louis University Medical School. From 1963 to 1970 he worked at Kansas State University. From 1970 to 1977 he was the chair of the Department of Biology at the University of Utah. In 1965 the American Society for Microbiology awarded him the Eli Lilly and Company-Elanco Research Award.

References

1930 births
2020 deaths
University of Chicago alumni
New York University alumni
University of Utah faculty
20th-century American biologists
21st-century American biologists